Mirta is a female given name which may refer to:

Mirta Aguirre (1912-1980), Cuban poet, novelist, journalist and political activist
Mirta Busnelli (born 1946), Argentine actress
Mirta Diaz-Balart (born 1928), first wife of Fidel Castro
Mirta Galesic, Croatian American psychologist
Mirta Miller (born 1948), Argentine actress
Mirta Ojito (born 1964), Cuban-American newspaper reporter
Mirta de Perales (1922-2011), Cuban-American beauty business entrepreneur and cosmetologist
Mirta Roses Periago, Argentine epidemiologist
 

Spanish feminine given names